GCC Exchange is a global money transfer and foreign exchange company that has an extensive presence in Europe, Africa, Oceania and Asia. Its headquarters are based in the UAE.

History 

In 2005, the organization was founded by Rajesh Himmatlal and Shaikh Mohammad Ibrahim Abdulaziz Al Mualla.
In December 2006, GCC Exchange expanded its operations to include the work of remittance in its business sphere. It expanded its services to Telex Transfers, the Real Time Account Transfer Facility with IMPS, Demand Drafts and Cash Home Delivery Services under remittance services. In the same month, the organization established its subsidiary in the United Kingdom and named it as GCC UK Exchange Ltd.

From 2007 to 2017, the company expanded its services from the GCC region to all over the globe, especially in Europe, Africa and Asia to become a leading money exchange company in the world. 
As such in 2017, GCC Exchange achieved another milestone by being awarded the Financial Award Winner for the year as well as broadening its horizons by establishing its branch in Singapore. In 2018, GCC Exchange emerged as best exchange house on social media.

Importance 

 GCC Exchange received the Fastest-Growing Remittance Award in 2017 in the UAE at the 5th Annual International Finance Awards Ceremony.
 It also received the Best Exchange House Award in Dubai at 2018
 GCC Exchange is also connected to all major banks of the world through Swift Accounting.
 It remits money to India many banks like Karur Vysya Bank connected to GCC Exchange.
 The company is tied up with Wynyard Group for anti-money-laundering systems in USE.

Subsidiaries
 GCC UK
 GCC Singapore
 GCC Remit
 GCC Exchange Private Ltd (Hong Kong) 
 GCC Exchange (Seychelles) (PTY) Limited 
 GCC Exchange (S) PTE Ltd 
 GCC Exchange (FIJI) Private Limited

References 

Financial services companies of the United Arab Emirates
Financial services companies established in 2005
2005 establishments in the United Arab Emirates